The Stanley River is a river of the Tasman Region of New Zealand's South Island. It flows southeast from its sources in the Douglas and Anatoki Ranges, reaching the Waingaro River 12 kilometres west of Upper Takaka.

Above the lake the river has two branches, both called Stanley River. The earthquake also formed Lower Lake Lindsay by a similar landslide, in the next valley to the north. In 2016 the Soper Shelter was built near the lake, replacing an earlier backcountry hut in the landslip area. Lake Sparrow is a tarn in the upper catchment of the valley.

The entire length of the Stanley river is within Kahurangi National Park. The valley is used by the Anatoki Forks Hut to Waingaro Forks Hut section of the Historic Kill Devil Pack Track, which crosses the landslip.

References

External links
 1998 aerial photo of Lake Stanley and the 1929 earthquake-induced landslide which formed it
 Photo of dead beech trees in Lake Stanley

Rivers of the Tasman District
Kahurangi National Park
Rivers of New Zealand